Elena Shinohara (born April 6, 2000) is a Japanese-born American rhythmic gymnast and social media personality. She is currently a member of the U.S. National Rhythmic Gymnastics Team.

Personal life
Elena Shinohara was born in Japan on April 6, 2000. She moved with her family to the United States when she was five months old. Her mother, Nancy Shinohara, is a former member of the Japanese national rhythmic gymnastics team, and she coaches Elena. She graduated from Collins Hill High School in 2018. She is currently a student at Georgia Tech, and she is majoring in biochemistry. She plans on becoming a dermatologist after her gymnastics career is over. Her father, Minoru Shinohara, runs the Human Neuromuscular Physiology Laboratory at Georgia Tech. Elena lives at her home in Suwanee, Georgia so that she can continue to train while still attending school.

Gymnastics career
Shinohara is the only elite-level rhythmic gymnast in the state of Georgia. She was named to the Junior U.S. National team in 2015.

Shinohara made her international debut at the 2018 Luxembourg Cup. She placed fourth in the ball, fifth in the ribbon, and seventh in the hoop. She also competed at the 2019 Irina Cup in Warsaw, Poland where she finished eighth in clubs. At the 2019 Amsterdam Masters, she won the silver medal in the all-around and the gold medal in the hoop.

At the 2019 National Championships, she finished tenth in the all-around, seventh in clubs and ribbon, and eighth in ball. She was then named to the Senior U.S. National team. She also won the 2019 Sportsperson of the Year Award, which was voted on by the top twelve rhythmic gymnasts at the competition. At the 2020 Rhythmic Challenge in Lake Placid, New York, she finished fifth in the all-around and won the bronze medal in clubs.

Social media
Shinohara posts training and flexibility videos on TikTok. As of June 2021, she has 4.8 million followers on TikTok.
In honor of Asian Pacific American Heritage Month in May 2021, TikTok named her an API TikTok Trailblazer.

References

External links
 

2000 births
Living people
American rhythmic gymnasts
People from Suwanee, Georgia
American TikTokers
21st-century American women